Various African-American newspapers have been published in Indiana. The Evansville weekly Our Age, which was in circulation by 1878, is the first known African-American newspaper in Indiana. Alternatively, some sources assign the title of first to the Indianapolis Leader or the Logansport Colored Visitor, both of which were first published in August 1879.  

A 1996 survey of Indiana's African-American newspapers found that two-thirds were founded before the Great Migration began in 1915. Only a quarter of the newspapers surveyed lasted for more than five years. Despite the high rate of attrition, African-American newspapers continued to be established in Indiana throughout the 20th century and into the 21st.

More than half the African-American newspapers in Indiana have been published in Indianapolis and Evansville. In the northern part of the state, the greatest number of such newspapers have been published in Gary.

The following list contains some newspapers published only on an irregular or sporadic basis, or for which no information on frequency is available. Many of these shorter-lived newspapers, particularly in the 19th century, were political broadsheets produced only in connection with a specific election.

African-American newspapers published in Indiana today include the Gary Crusader, the Indianapolis Recorder, the Fort Wayne Ink Spot, and Evansville's Our Times Newspaper.

Northern Indiana 

Northern Indiana is the northern third of the state, home to the industrial Calumet Region as well as small cities further east such as South Bend, Fort Wayne and Logansport.

Central Indiana 

Central Indiana takes up the central third of the state, including the state capital Indianapolis as well as numerous small cities including Anderson, Muncie and Terre Haute.

Southern Indiana 

Southern Indiana makes up the southern third of the state, and is home to the Indiana's third-largest city Evansville, as well as smaller cities along the Ohio River.

See also
List of African-American newspapers and media outlets
List of African-American newspapers in Illinois
List of African-American newspapers in Michigan
List of African-American newspapers in Ohio
List of newspapers in Indiana

Works cited

References

Newspapers
Indiana
African-American newspapers
African-American